Évecquemont is a commune in the Yvelines department in the Île-de-France in north-central France.

Notable people
 Jeanine Delpech (1905-1992), French journalist, translator, novelist

See also
Communes of the Yvelines department

References

Communes of Yvelines